Manolo Mosciaro (born 17 September 1985) is an Italian footballer who last played for Italian club FC Aprilia.

Biography

Serie D years
Born in Cosenza, Calabria, Mosciaro started his career at Castrovillari, a local team in Castrovillari, in the Province of Cosenza. He scored twice in 2002–03 Serie D. Castrovillari moved to Cosenza as A.S. Cosenza F.C. to replace the void of Cosenza Calcio 1914 SpA in 2003, which was excluded from professional football (but re-admitted to 2004–05 Serie D). In the same year Mosciaro left for another Serie D (Italian fifth division until 2014, top division of amateur football) team Sanremese, which he scored 4 times for the Ligurian club. The club was admitted to Serie C2 at the start of 2004–05 season. Yet in the same year Mosciaro returned to Cosenza for the old Cosenza, which he was played in the derby match against Cosenza F.C.

Serie C clubs
In 2005, he returned to Liguria region for Sanremese. He was a player in Serie C2 until the club relegation in 2007.

In August 2007 Mosciaro was signed by Serie C1 club Crotone. He left the Calabrian team in January 2008 for Cuoio Pelli – Cappiano Romaiano. He scored 3 goals for the Serie C2 club.

In 2008 Mosciaro left for Pro Patria, where he made his debut in the third division, now renamed as Lega Pro Prima Divisione.

In 2009, he returned to the fourth division for Calabrian club Catanzaro. He was the team topscorer of 17+1 goals, ahead Lucas Longoni (14+0 goals) and Antonio Montella (10+2 goals in league and playoffs, 2 goals in cup). The club failed to win the promotion playoffs. Mosciaro also played twice for Catanzaro in 2009–10 Lega Pro Cup.

In 2010, he was signed by another third division club Pisa.

Cosenza
In 2011 Mosciaro returned to Cosenza again. The football club of Cosenza folded again after 4 years of existence (since bought the club registration of Rende in 2007). The new entity Nuova Cosenza Calcio S.r.l. was admitted to 2011–12 Serie D. Mosciaro became a protagonist of the club as bomber. He scored 21 goals and 28 goals respectively in 2011–12 and 2012–13 Serie D season. The club promoted on 5 August to fill the vacancies. Mosciaro signed a new 2-year contract on 17 August 2013.

In 2013–14 Lega Pro Seconda Divisione the club "promoted" again, as Lega Pro (ex–Serie C) would reduced from two divisions to one, as well as 69 teams in 2013–14 season to 60 teams in 2014–15 Lega Pro. Cosenza finished as the fourth of group B. Mosciaro was the team joint-second scorer of 7 goals (along with Elio Calderini) behind Gianluca De Angelis and ahead Jonatan Alessandro.

Aversa Normanna
On 8 January 2015 he was signed by Aversa Normanna.

Rende
On 29 July 2015 Mosciaro returned to the Province of Cosenza again for S.S. Rende.

References

External links
 AIC profile (data by football.it) 
 

Italian footballers
S.S.D. Sanremese Calcio players
Cosenza Calcio 1914 players
Cosenza Calcio players
F.C. Crotone players
Aurora Pro Patria 1919 players
U.S. Catanzaro 1929 players
Pisa S.C. players
Serie C players
Association football forwards
Sportspeople from Cosenza
1985 births
Living people
S.F. Aversa Normanna players
U.S. Castrovillari Calcio players
Footballers from Calabria